Abdul Rwatubyaye (born 23 October 1996) is a Rwandan footballer who plays as a defender and captain for RAYON SPORTS F.C.

References

External links
 
 

Living people
1996 births
Rwandan footballers
Rwanda international footballers
Rwandan expatriate footballers
People from Kigali
Association football defenders
Isonga F.C. players
APR F.C. players
Rayon Sports F.C. players
Sporting Kansas City players
Sporting Kansas City II players
Colorado Rapids players
Colorado Springs Switchbacks FC players
FK Shkupi players
Major League Soccer players
USL Championship players
Macedonian First Football League players
Expatriate soccer players in the United States
Rwandan expatriate sportspeople in the United States
Expatriate footballers in North Macedonia
Rwandan expatriate sportspeople in North Macedonia
2016 African Nations Championship players
Rwanda A' international footballers